Paul Afoko is Ghanaian politician and businessman.

Family and early life
Paul Afoko was born on 31 August 1954. He is from the royal family of Sandema in the Upper East Region of Ghana, therefore a Builsa. Afoko studied at the Bawku Secondary school, Navrongo Secondary School and the London School of Economics.

Politics
Afoko agitated against the union government idea during the regime of General Ignatius Kutu Acheampong in the 1970s as well as against the overthrow of Dr. Hilla Limann by J.J. Rawlings in the 1980s. He was jailed by the PNDC for his agitations but managed to escape to the United Kingdom where he stayed in exile for a number of years before returning to Ghana in 2000.

During the 2007 contest to select NPP's candidate for the Ghanaian Presidency, Afoko was ushered out of NPP congress grounds in the University of Ghana by the police after he was attacked by others and accused ally of Alan Kyeremanteng, one of the contestants and was further accused of sharing money to delegates.

He won the contest for party chairmanship on 12 April 2014 at a party congress held in Tamale, Ghana's northern regional capital.

He was suspended by the party after some party members petitioned the disciplinary committee of the party. Mr. Afoko disputed both the basis and the legality of the suspension and has taken the issue to court. Subsequent to his suspension, the party's general secretary, Kwabena Agyapong, as well as one vice chairman, Sammy Crabbe, were also suspended through a similar process. Afoko and Crabbe filed processes in the court disputing their suspensions.

Controversy
After having won the party chairmanship, Afoko and the party's General Secretary, Kwabena Agyapong had a lot of resistance. Things came to a head when a party meeting was called when Afoko was out of Ghana and the party General Secretary was in Kumasi. Later, the two went around the country to meet party officials but were chased away by some party supporters and had to be saved by the police. The party chairman of the region, Adam Mahama, justified the attack on the two but later apologized. In the night of 20 May 2015, Adam Mahama was attacked by assailants who poured acid on him. He died in the hospital on 21 May 2015.

Prior to his death, a woman called Booya alleged that Adam Mahama mentioned the name of one Gregory Afoko a brother of Paul Afoko as the suspect. The police subsequently arrested Gregory, investigated and presented him before the courts. The other has been granted bail.
Calls for Paul Afoko and the General Secretary to be pushed out of the party, which started before the murder however continued to grow.

Personal life
He is married with four children. He is also a businessman.

References

People from Northern Region (Ghana)
1954 births
Living people
New Patriotic Party politicians